Tianjin Eye, the official name The Tientsin Eye, is a -tall giant ferris wheel built above the Yongle Bridge (formerly Chihai Bridge), over the Hai River in Tianjin, China.

Construction started in 2007, with completion of the main body on 18 December 2007, and the wheel opened to the public on 7 April 2008.

At the time of its completion, only the  London Eye,  Star of Nanchang, and  Singapore Flyer were taller.

Tianjin Eye, also called "The Tientsin Eye" is electrically powered and has 48 passenger capsules, each able to carry 8 passengers, and takes 30 minutes to complete a rotation, giving a maximum capacity of 768 passengers per hour.

References

External links
 Photos at panoramio.com

Buildings and structures in Tianjin
Ferris wheels in China
Tourist attractions in Tianjin